Roy Eric Farnsworth (1892-1957) was an Australian rugby league footballer who played in the 1910s.

Playing career
Youngest brother of the famous rugby league footballers: Bill Farnsworth and Viv Farnsworth, Roy Farnsworth was also a noted Half-back with Newtown. Roy enlisted in the Australian Army in World War I in 1915, and although he survived the war he did not play for Newtown again.

In 1919 he turned out for Western Suburbs for a few games, before retiring from the NSWRFL.

Death
Farnsworth died on 19 June 1957 at Concord, New South Wales.

References

1892 births
1957 deaths
Newtown Jets players
Western Suburbs Magpies players
New South Wales rugby league team players
Rugby league players from Sydney
Rugby league halfbacks
Australian rugby league players
Australian military personnel of World War I